Dihammaphora laterilineata' is a species of beetle in the family Cerambycidae. It was described by Zajciw in 1965.

References

Dihammaphora
Beetles described in 1965